Daragh Carville (born in Armagh in 1969) is an Irish playwright, screenwriter and educator. He is best known for co-creating and writing the ITV crime drama The Bay, first broadcast on ITV in 2019, attracting an average audience of over seven million viewers.

Career

Stage
Theatre credits include Language Roulette (Bush Theatre, London and Traverse Theatre, Edinburgh), Observatory (Peacock Theatre, Dublin) and This Other City (Grand Opera House, Belfast). Carville has won the Stewart Parker and the Meyer-Whitworth awards. His new play The Life and Times of Mitchell & Kenyon opened at the Dukes Theatre, Lancaster in April 2014.

His radio credits include Regenerations (BBC Radio 3), which features on the BBC Audio release Doctor Who at the BBC: The Plays, and Dracula (BBC Radio 4) starring Michael Fassbender.

Screen
Carville's first feature film, Middletown, premiered at the Tribeca Film Festival in New York in 2006. The film, which stars Matthew Macfadyen, Daniel Mays, Eva Birthistle and Gerard McSorley, was directed by Brian Kirk and produced by Michael Casey of Green Park Films. It was nominated in nine categories at the 2007 Irish Film and Television Awards, including Best Film and Best Screenplay, with Eva Birthistle picking up the award for Best Actress.

Carville's second film, Cherrybomb, starring Rupert Grint, Robert Sheehan, Kimberley Nixon and James Nesbitt and directed by Glenn Leyburn and Lisa Barros d’Sa, was selected for the Generations section of the 2009 Berlin Film Festival and won the Audience Award at the 2009 Belfast Film Festival. Cherrybomb went on general release in the UK and Ireland in April 2010, distributed by Universal.

The second series of The Bay screened on ITV in 2021, a third broadcast in 2022, with a fourth series in production. In addition to The Bay, other television work included episodes of BBC Three’s Being Human, BBC Northern Ireland's student drama 6Degrees and the Kudos/Sky One firefighter drama The Smoke.

Personal life
Carville lives in Lancaster with his wife, novelist Jo Baker, and their two children. He currently teaches Creative Writing at Birkbeck, University of London.

References

External links 
 
 Profile at BBC Website for 6Degrees

Living people
1969 births
21st-century writers from Northern Ireland
Male dramatists and playwrights from Northern Ireland
British male television writers
Screenwriters from Northern Ireland
Television writers from Northern Ireland
21st-century British screenwriters
Alumni of the University of Kent